The Treason Act 1777 (17 Geo.3 c.9) was an Act of the Parliament of Great Britain passed during the American Revolution. It required that anyone who was charged with or suspected of high treason or piracy in America or on the high seas be held in custody without bail or trial until 1 January 1778. Bail could only be granted by an order of the Privy Council, signed by six members of the council.
The Act was due to expire on 1 January 1778, but this was extended annually to 1 January of each successive year until 1 January 1783, when it was finally allowed to expire.

References

See also
Treason Act
Habeas Corpus Suspension Act

Great Britain Acts of Parliament 1777
Treason in the United Kingdom
British laws relating to the American Revolution